Songbai Temple is a Buddhist temple located in Changsha County, Hunan, China.

History
The original temple dates back to the 11th century, during the region of Shenzong Emperor (1067–1085) of the Song dynasty (960–1127). At that time, Chan master Yuanjian resided in the temple, where he taught Chan Buddhism for many years, and attracted large numbers of practitioners. But because of war and natural disasters, it declined and was disappeared during the Republic of China. A modern restoration of the entire temple complex was carried out in 2002.

Architecture
The complex include the following halls: Shanmen, Mahavira Hall, Hall of Four Heavenly Kings, Hall of Guanyin, Bell tower, Drum tower, Hall of Guru, Dharma Hall, Dining Room, etc.

Gallery

References

Buddhist temples in Changsha
Tourist attractions in Changsha
21st-century establishments in China
21st-century Buddhist temples
Religious buildings and structures completed in 2002
Linji school temples